Laven may refer to:

Geography
Laven, a railway town in Central Jutland, Denmark
Låven, a mountain of Oppland, Norway

Linguistics
Laven language, a Mon–Khmer language of Laos

People
Arnold Laven (1922-2009), American film and television director and producer
Lea Laven (b. 1948), Finnish pop singer